Kampung Pandan is a village/settlement located in the Titiwangsa constituency in eastern Kuala Lumpur, Malaysia, surrounded by Ampang, Maluri, Pudu and Bukit Bintang. Once a small settlement, Kampung Pandan has now grown and developed tremendously.

It used to be an area of well planned settlement (with title deed) under Rural Industrial Development Authority (RIDA) to accommodate/ relocate people who were moved from their areas of settlement for development purposes (among the areas were Maxwell Village) in the late 1960s.

Kampung Pandan was developed into two sections of the settlement namely Kampong Pandan Dalam (settlement) and Kampong Pandan Luar (commercial area or locally known as the town area). Along with the development of Kuala Lumpur, the area prospered.

The settlement however seen squatter areas, inhabited by people from other Malaysian states who were looking for job opportunities in the city back in the early 1970s.

More squatter houses were built in the early 1990s as there were demand from illegal immigrants (mostly Indonesian) who worked in various industries especially the emerging commercial development (construction). In early 2000s, the squatter areas were demolished.

The current residences in Kampung Pandan are part of the original settlement and the houses are changing (renovated/rebuilt)rapidly in terms of its designs while some retained its original design adding a quaint charm to the area.

The village has an elementary school built named Sekolah Rendah Kampong Pandan which was renamed as Sekolah Rendah Kebangsaan Tun Hussein Onn.

Among famous landmark in Kampung Pandan is the Mokhtar Dahari Community Square or Dataran Komuniti Mokhtar Dahari, a community square named after the famous Malaysian footballer as he used to live in Kampung Pandan and played football here.

Public transportation
rapidKL bus T407 connects some areas in Kampung Pandan to  Tun Razak Exchange MRT station.

Educational institutions
SK Tun Hussein Onn (formerly known as SK Kampong Pandan)
SMART College
Security Plus Academy
SMK St. Gabriel
Tsun Jin Primary School
SMK Aminuddin Baki
Institut Kemahiran Mara (IKM) Kuala Lumpur
SMK Datok Lokman
Taylor's International School Kuala Lumpur (formerly known as Sekolah Sri Garden)
SMK Taman Maluri

Sports and recreation
 Malaysia Paralympic Sports Excellence Centre (MPSEC or PKSPM) - Headquarters of the Paralympic Council of Malaysia (PCM).

See also
 Kampung Padang Balang
 Masjid Nurul Hidayah

References

Villages in Kuala Lumpur
Squats